was a Japanese painter and pottery artist.

Biography 
Koizumi was born in Kamakura, Kanagawa in 1924 and, in 1952, graduated from Tokyo National University of Fine Arts and Music (present name Tokyo University of the Arts; Jap. 東京芸術大学 Tōkyō Geijutsu Daigaku or Geidai 芸大). He has held a number of gallery shows in Japan, and has painted remarkable images on the ceilings of the Kennin-ji temple in Kyoto (2002), and Kenchō-ji temple in Kamakura (2003). He is a member of no particular school, and his ink paintings (suibokuga) of Japan's mountains have received critical acclaim.

Notes

1924 births
2012 deaths
People from Kamakura
Deaths from pneumonia in Japan
Nihonga painters
Buddhist artists